Nidotherapy, after  (Latin: nest), is an experimental form of psychotherapy, described as "a collaborative treatment involving the systematic assessment and modification of the environment to minimize the impact of any form of mental disorder on the individual or on society".

Etymology 
The word nidotherapy is derived from the Latin , or "nest".

History 
It was introduced for patients with severe mental illness, mainly schizophrenia, and personality disorders2 who had failed to respond to conventional treatments and were usually antagonistic to services. The aim of nidotherapy is not to change the person but to create a better fit between the environment (in all its forms) and the patient. As a consequence the patient may improve but this is not a direct result of treatment but because a more harmonious relationship has been created with the environment.3 An essential part of nidotherapy is a full environmental analysis carried out from the patient's standpoint and with their full cooperation (provided they have the capacity) so that any changes recommended and implemented (the nidopathway) are understood and preferably owned by the patient instead of being imposed. Although nidotherapy has been classed as a psychotherapy, it differs in not trying to alter the patient, only the environment.

Medical and therapeutic use 
Nidotherapy has been used mainly in the treatment of severe mental illness in assertive community treatment and community mental health services.4-6

There is no good evidence that any form of nidotherapy is effective, as it is still experimental.

References

Notes 
 
 
 Tyrer, P. Nidotherapy: harmonising the environment with the patient.    . London; RCPsych Press, 2009.
 
 
 
 
 

Mind–body interventions
Psychotherapies